Minuscule 278a (in the Gregory-Aland numbering), ε 1088 (Soden), is a Greek minuscule manuscript of the New Testament, on parchment. It is dated by a colophon to the year 1072. 
It has full marginalia.

Description 

The codex contains the text of the four Gospels on 305 parchment leaves, with one lacunae (Matthew 13:43-17:5). The text is written in one column per page, in 21 lines per page.

There is also another division according to the smaller Ammonian Sections (in Mark 234, the last section in 16:9), with references to the Eusebian Canons (written below Ammonian Section numbers).

It contains the Epistula ad Carpianum, Eusebian Canon tables, lectionary markings at the margins, synaxaria, Menologion, Armenian inscriptions, and pictures. 
Matthew 13:43-17:5 was written by another, earlier hand in the 10th century. According to Scrivener it was a later hand. 
This part now is classified separately and designated by 278b according to the numbering of Gregory-Aland.

Text 

The Greek text of the codex is a representative of the Byzantine text-type. Aland placed it in Category V.

According to the Claremont Profile Method it belongs to the cluster Π278 in Luke 1, Luke 10, and Luke 20. To this cluster belong manuscripts 1209 and 1509.

History 

The manuscript was written by Methodius, a monk and presbyter. The manuscript was added to the list of New Testament manuscripts by Scholz (1794-1852). 
It was examined and described by Paulin Martin.

The manuscript is currently housed at the Bibliothèque nationale de France (Gr. 82, fol. 1-41.51-305) in Paris.

See also 

 List of New Testament minuscules
 Biblical manuscript
 Textual criticism
 Minuscule 278b

References

Further reading 

 Jean-Pierre-Paul Martin, Description technique des manuscrits grecs, relatif au Nouveau Testament, conservé dans les bibliothèques des Paris (Paris 1883), p. 67

External links 
 

Greek New Testament minuscules
11th-century biblical manuscripts
Bibliothèque nationale de France collections